Parchimer Allee is a Berlin U-Bahn station located on the .

Opened in 1963 and constructed by W. Düttmann. The next station is Britz-Sud.

References 

U7 (Berlin U-Bahn) stations
Buildings and structures in Neukölln
Railway stations in Germany opened in 1963